Richard Estrada Chavez (November 12, 1929 – July 27, 2011) was an American labor leader, organizer and activist. Chavez was the younger brother of labor leader César Chávez, who co-founded the National Farm Workers Association, now known as the United Farm Workers (UFW). Richard Chavez is credited with building the UFW into a major California agricultural and political organization.

Chavez was born to a migrant family on November 12, 1929, near Yuma, Arizona, on a family farm. He worked as a child migrant worker during the Great Depression. He transitioned from farm work to carpentry and moved to San Jose, California. In the early 1960s, Chavez would leave his job as a carpenter in order to assist Cesar Chavez in his effort to organize California farm workers. Richard Chavez was a co-founder of the National Farm Workers Association with his brother Cesar Chavez and organizing leader Dolores Huerta, which would later become known as the United Farm Workers (UFW).

Richard Chavez spearheaded the construction of the United Farm Workers' union hall, which became its headquarters, in Delano, California. Paul Chavez, the president of the Cesar Chavez Foundation and son of Cesar Chavez, told the Los Angeles Times that "was there before there was a union."  In 1962, Richard Chavez designed the now iconic logo of the United Farm Workers, which features a black Aztec eagle. (Cesar Chavez chose the red and black colors of the union.) Decades later, U.S. President Barack Obama called the eagle "a symbol of hope that has helped carry the struggle for the rights of farm workers forward for almost five decades."

In 1966, Chavez became the founding director of the National Farm Workers Service Center, which opened up social services to farm workers. Chavez used his home as collateral to establish the UFW's credit union. Chavez helped organize the Delano grape strike and boycott which was led by Dolores Huerta, which spanned five years during the late 1960s. He later helped organize other strikes in Detroit and New York City.

Richard Chavez served as the third Vice President of the United Farm Workers from 1972 until his retirement in 1984.  Chavez retired from the United Farm Workers union in 1983, but continued to serve on the board of directors of the Cesar Chavez Foundation and the Dolores Huerta Foundation. Chavez worked as a Los Angeles-based custom home builder during the 1990s after he received a California contractor's license.

For many years, Chavez maintained a liaison with fellow labor leader Dolores Huerta.  They never married, but four children were born of the relationship.

Richard Chavez died from complications of surgery at a hospital in Bakersfield, California, on July 27, 2011, at the age of 81. He was survived by ten children, six from his first marriage and four from his relationship with Dolores Huerta. Chavez was also survived by two sisters, Rita Chavez Medina and Vicki Chavez Lastra, and one surviving brother, Librado Chavez.

President Barack Obama issued a statement calling Chavez a "symbol of hope." Chavez had visited Obama at the White House in 2010 to mark Cesar Chavez Day.

References

United Farm Workers people
American trade union leaders
American trade unionists of Mexican descent
American carpenters
People from Yuma, Arizona
1929 births
2011 deaths
Cesar Chavez
People from Delano, California
Trade unionists from California